The 2021–22 Eastern Illinois Panthers men's basketball team represented Eastern Illinois University in the 2021–22 NCAA Division I men's basketball season. The Panthers, led by first-year head coach Marty Simmons, played their home games at Lantz Arena in Charleston, Illinois as members of the Ohio Valley Conference. They finished the season 5–26, 3–15 in OVC play to finish in last place. They failed to qualify for the OVC Tournament.

Previous season
In a season limited due to the ongoing COVID-19 pandemic, the Panthers finished the 2020–21 season 9–18, 6–14 in OVC play to finish in a tie for ninth place. They failed to qualify for the OVC Tuournament.

On March 4, 2021, the school announced that they would not renew head coach Jay Spoonhour's contract. On March 31, the school named Clemson assistant and former Evansville head coach Marty Simmons as the team's new head coach.

Roster

Schedule and results

|-
!colspan=12 style=| Non-conference regular season

|-
!colspan=9 style=| Ohio Valley regular season

Source

References

Eastern Illinois Panthers men's basketball seasons
Eastern Illinois Panthers
Eastern Illinois Panthers men's basketball
Eastern Illinois Panthers men's basketball